Arthur Rupert Malberg (24 May 1907 – 17 September 1977) was an Australian rules footballer who played for the Footscray Football Club and North Melbourne Football Club in the Victorian Football League (VFL).

Notes

External links 
		

1907 births
1977 deaths
Australian rules footballers from Melbourne
Western Bulldogs players
North Melbourne Football Club players
People from Newport, Victoria